Munmurra River, a perennial river of the Hunter River catchment, is located in the Upper Hunter region of New South Wales, Australia.

Course and features
Munmurra River rises on the southern slopes of the Great Dividing Range, below Breeza Lookout, northeast of Cassilis and flows generally south by west, joined by four minor tributaries before reaching its confluence with the Goulburn River. The river descends  over its  course.

South of the town of Cassilis, the Golden Highway crosses the Munmurra River.

See also

 List of rivers of Australia
 List of rivers of New South Wales (L–Z)
 Goulburn River National Park
 Rivers of New South Wales

References

External links
 

 

Rivers of New South Wales
Rivers of the Hunter Region
Upper Hunter Shire